Clarence River Light, also known as Yamba Light or Clarence Head Light, is an active lighthouse located on Pilot Hill, a hill in Wooli Park, Yamba, New South Wales, Australia, south of the entrance of Clarence River. The current lighthouse was built in 1955, replacing a previous lighthouse built in 1880. It serves as the rear range light for two different ranges.

History

Old lighthouse

The first light on Pilot Hill was most probably a platform with a kerosene lamp, located on the eastern part of the hill. The first actual structure was a small wooden hut built in 1866 with a large kerosene lamp placed on a bench. The mast from this lighthouse is on display at the Story House Museum in Yamba.

In 1878 tenders were called for a permanent lighthouse, one of five lighthouses of similar design designed by James Barnet in 1878–80, the other four being Fingal Head Light, Crowdy Head Light, Tacking Point Lighthouse and Richmond River Light. It was built by W. Kinnear at a cost of £1,097, and construction was completed in 1880.

A keeper's cottage was also constructed near-by.

In 1920 the lighthouse was automated and demanned.

In 1934 the Pacific Hotel was built in Yamba, and the light was somewhat obscured. In addition, a water reservoir was to be built at the location. A new lighthouse was built in 1955, and the old lighthouse was demolished in 1956.

Restoration
After the reservoir was demolished in 1980, an attempt has been made to raise government funds to erect a replica of the lighthouse at the original location. However, as funds could not be raised, local volunteers self-funded and built the replica, but without the lantern. The building houses the Yamba Community Radio Station 2TLC. In 2009, a project began to fully restore the lighthouse again, with support from local individuals and businesses. In November 2011 the project was almost completed, with the installation of a lantern and an original 19th century Fresnel lens donated by the Australian Maritime Safety Authority (AMSA) for the project.

Current lighthouse

The new lighthouse was built in 1955 from concrete in a modern style. The apparatus from the old lighthouse was transferred.

The power source is a battery charged from the mains electricity. The current characteristic is three white flashes every 15 seconds (Fl.(3)W. 15s). It also shows a fixed blue light (F.Bu.) which serves as a rear light for the North Channel Range Front Light at -131° (NGA 5945, Admiralty K2822, showing Iso.Bu. 2s).

Site operation and visiting
The light is operated by the Australian Maritime Safety Authority, while the site is managed by the New South Wales Department of Lands. The grounds are open and accessible to the public, and parking is available close by. The tower itself is closed.

See also

 List of lighthouses in Australia

Notes

References

External links

 

Lighthouses completed in 1955
Lighthouses in New South Wales
Lighthouses completed in 1866
1866 establishments in Australia